106th meridian may refer to:

106th meridian east, a line of longitude east of the Greenwich Meridian
106th meridian west, a line of longitude west of the Greenwich Meridian